Șamșud is a commune located in Sălaj County, Crișana, Romania. It is composed of two villages, Șamșud and Valea Pomilor (Mocirla until 1956; Mocsolya).

The Șamșud gas field lies within the perimeter of the commune.

Demographics
In 2011, it had a population of 1,723; out of them, 91.7% were Hungarian, 4.9% were Roma, and 1.6% were Romanian.

Sights 
 Orthodox church in Șamșud, built in the 19th century (1885), historic monument
 Reformed church in Șamșud, built in the 17th century
 Reformed church in Valea Pomilor, completed in 1794

References

Communes in Sălaj County
Localities in Crișana